John Ellis Caerwyn Williams FBA (17 January 1912 – 10 June 1999), was a Welsh scholar. His fields of study included the literatures of the Celtic languages, especially Welsh and Irish literature. He has published books in both English and Welsh.

Caerwyn Williams was born in Gwauncaegurwen, Glamorgan in 1912 into a coal-mining family. He studied at the University College of North Wales, Bangor and graduated in Latin in 1933 and in Welsh in 1934. He then studied further at University College, Dublin and Trinity College, Dublin. Intending to become a minister in the Presbyterian Church of Wales he studied at the United Theological College, Aberystwyth and graduated BD in 1944. In 1945 he was appointed to teach at the Department of Welsh at the University College of North Wales, Bangor and became professor of Welsh in 1953. He remained in that post until his appointment as professor of Irish at the University College of Wales, Aberystwyth in 1965, where he remained until his retirement in 1979. He was elected a Fellow of the British Academy in 1978. In 1971 he delivered the British Academy's Sir John Rhŷs Memorial Lecture.

See also
 Bewnans Ke

References

Selected publications
Traddodiad llenyddol Iwerddon (=The literary tradition of Ireland) (1958), later translated into English as The Irish literary tradition (1992)
The Poems of Taliesin (Mediaeval & Modern Welsh) (editor, with Ifor Williams, 1968)
Literature in Celtic Countries (1971)
Y storïwr Gwyddelig a'i chwedlau (=The Irish story-teller and his tales) (1972)
Poets of the Welsh Princes (Writers of Wales S.) (1978)
Ysgrifau Beirniadol (=Critical writings) (1965- ) Founding editor of the series of volumes of critical essays mainly on Welsh-language literature.

1912 births
1999 deaths
Alumni of University College Dublin
Alumni of Trinity College Dublin
Alumni of Bangor University
Alumni of the University of Wales
Fellows of the British Academy
Welsh-speaking academics